Óscar Andrés Tunjo (born 5 January 1996) is a Colombian racing driver.

Career

Karting
Born in Cali, Tunjo began his racing career in karting at the age of five in Colombian championships, collecting titles in various classes. In 2007 he moved to Europe, and competed in local karting series.

Formula BMW
Tunjo made his début in single-seaters in 2010 at the age of fourteen, taking part in the Formula BMW Pacific series for Meritus. He finished the season as runner-up to Richard Bradley with one win at the -support round, while also scoring another four podiums.

Formula Renault
Tunjo returned to Europe in 2011, competing for Josef Kaufmann Racing in both the Eurocup Formula Renault 2.0 and the Formula Renault 2.0 NEC, the latter on a part-time basis. He closed out the top ten in the Eurocup driver standings – including a podium at the Hungaroring – while in the NEC he had one podium at the Nürburgring.

Tunjo switched to Tech 1 Racing in 2012, competing in both the Formula Renault 2.0 Alps and the Eurocup Formula Renault series. He finished fourth in the Alps series with two wins, and seventh in the Eurocup with a win at Barcelona.

Tunjo returned to Josef Kaufmann Racing for the 2013 season, competing in the Formula Renault 2.0 NEC and the Eurocup Formula Renault series. He improved to sixth place in the Eurocup standings and had a win at Spa in the NEC series.

Formula Renault 3.5 Series

Tunjo scheduled to make his Formula Three debut in the FIA European Formula Three Championship in 2014, racing for Signature. But when Signature withdrew from the championship he signed a contract with Pons Racing to compete in Formula Renault 3.5 Series in both 2014 and 2015.

Racing record

Career summary

* Season still in progress.

Complete Formula Renault 3.5 Series results
(key) (Races in bold indicate pole position) (Races in italics indicate fastest lap)

Complete GP3 Series results
(key) (Races in bold indicate pole position) (Races in italics indicate fastest lap)

Complete GT World Challenge Europe Sprint Cup results

Complete European Le Mans Series results
(key) (Races in bold indicate pole position; results in italics indicate fastest lap)

References

External links
 
 

1996 births
Living people
Sportspeople from Cali
Colombian racing drivers
Formula BMW Pacific drivers
Formula Renault Eurocup drivers
Formula Renault 2.0 NEC drivers
Formula Renault 2.0 Alps drivers
World Series Formula V8 3.5 drivers
Colombian GP3 Series drivers
Mercedes-AMG Motorsport drivers
Team Meritus drivers
Josef Kaufmann Racing drivers
Tech 1 Racing drivers
Pons Racing drivers
Trident Racing drivers
Jenzer Motorsport drivers
Phoenix Racing drivers
W Racing Team drivers
GT4 European Series drivers
Toksport WRT drivers